The Limbach L 2400 are a series of German piston aero-engines designed and built by Limbach Flugmotoren. It is a four-cylinder, four-stroke air-cooled flat piston engine typically between 93-130 hp (69.4-97 kW) power output.

Variants
L 2400 DE3.X
Dual ignition system. 
L 2400 DF
Certified in March 2001, has an electronically controlled fuel injection and double ignition system. Tractor type engine with alternator in the front and starter in the back.
L 2400 DT
Certified in September 2001, has an electronically controlled fuel injection and double ignition system. Tractor type engine  with alternator in the back and starter in the back.
L 2400 EB
Certified in June 1985, has a carburettor and magneto ignition system. Two carburettors in the back, alternator in the back and starter in the back. 
L 2400 EE
Certified in July 1999, has a carbuettor and magneto ignition system. Two carburettors in the back, alternator in the front and starter in the front.
L 2400 EF
Certified in February 1997, has an electronically controlled fuel injection and ignition system. Tractor type engine with alternator in the front and starter in the back.
L 2400 EFI
Fully electronic fuel injection. 
L 2400 EO.X
Single ignition system. 
L 2400 ET
Certified in September 2001, has an electronically controlled fuel injection and ignition system. Tractor type engine  with alternator in the back and starter in the back.

Applications
Grob G 109
Hoffmann HK 36 Super Dimona
Hinz BLT-ARA
Hoffmann H-40
Stemme S10
Valentin Taifun

Specifications (L 2400 EF)

See also

References

Notes

Bibliography

Purdy, Don: AeroCrafter - Homebuilt Aircraft Sourcebook, page 72. BAI Communications. 

Limbach aircraft engines
1980s aircraft piston engines